This is a list of the governors of the Banque Centrale du Congo in Kinshasa. The bank, which is the country's central bank, was founded after independence in 1960.

 Albert Ndele, 1961–1970
 Jules Fontaine Sambwa, 1970–1977
 Charles Bofossa Wambea Nkosso, 1977–1979
 Jules Croy Emony Mondanga, 1979–1980
 Jules Fontaine Sambwa, 1980–1985 (second term)
 Pierre Pay-Pay wa Syakasighe, 1985–1991
 Jean Nyembo Shabani, 1991–1993
 Joseph Buhendwa bwa Mushasa, 1993–1994
 Godefroid Ndiang Kabul, 1994
 Djamboleka Lona Okitongono, 1995–1997
 , 1997–14.05.2013
 Deogratias Mutombo Mwana Nyembo, 14.05.2013–present

References

See also
Central banks and currencies of Africa

Economy of the Democratic Republic of the Congo
Governors